Sermathang is a village in northeastern Nepal situated at an altitude of 2500 meters (approximately) from sea level. It lies southeast of the Helambu Village Council in Sindhupalchowk District.

Demographics 
Inhabitants of Sermathang are Yolmo people and speak the Yolmo language.

Economy 
People in Shermathang are mostly employed in tourism and agriculture. Some families work as seasonal migrant labourers.

Transport 
Being specific to a locality, Shermathang, a village of Helambu, is in the northernmost part of the rural municipality surrounded by Chhimi, Thangpaldhap, Bhotang, Chitre, Kakane, Kieul, and other villages of the district. Shermahtnag is on the lap of the mountain just below the forest area of Langtang National Park (LNP). It is accessible by graveled roads from the main bazaar Melamchi and the capital city Kathmandu these days and has frequent bus service on winter days.

References 

Populated places in Sindhupalchowk District